Sura or Sooraa (Sanskrit and Pāli;) is a strong distilled alcoholic drink originating from the Indian subcontinent. It is referred to as an anaesthetic by Suśruta (a surgeon in India circa 400 BCE). Other ancient medical authorities also mention it; Charaka referred to making a woman with a miscarriage senseless to pain by administering alcoholic drinks like sooraa, sīdhu, ariṣṭa, madhu, madirā or āsava.

History 
The method for preparation appears in the Atharvaveda in the Kandas 5 and 8.

In Buddhist texts surāh is mentioned as one of intoxicating drinks, along with (Pali) meraya (Sanskrit maireya, a drink made with sugar cane and several spices) and majja (maybe equivalent of Sanskrit madhu, mead or hydromel), and renunciation of its usage constitutes the 5th of the Buddhist precepts (pañca-sīlāni): "I undertake the training rule to abstain from fermented drinks which cause heedlessness" (Surāmerayamajjapamādaṭṭhānā veramaṇī sikkhāpadaṃ samādiyāmi).

See also

 Alcoholic Indian beverages
 Beer in India 
 Desi daru
 Indian whisky

References

Indian distilled drinks
Ayurveda
Indian alcoholic drinks
Traditional Indian alcoholic beverages